In Greek mythology, Andromeda (or ) is the daughter of the king of Aethiopia, Cepheus, and his wife, Cassiopeia. When Cassiopeia boasts that she is more beautiful than the Nereids, Poseidon sends the sea monster Cetus to ravage the coast of Aethiopia as divine punishment. Andromeda is chained to a rock as a sacrifice to sate the monster, but is saved from death by Perseus, who marries her and takes her to Greece to reign as his queen.

As a subject, Andromeda has been popular in art since classical times; rescued by a Greek hero, Andromeda's narration is considered the forerunner to the "princess and dragon" motif. From the Renaissance, interest revived in the original story, typically as derived from Ovid's Metamorphoses (4.663ff). The story has appeared many times in such diverse media as plays, poetry, novels, operas, classical and popular music, film, and paintings. The Andromeda constellation is named after her.

The Andromeda tradition, from classical times onwards, has incorporated elements of other stories, including Saint George and the Dragon, introducing a horse for the hero, and the tale of Pegasus, Bellerophon's winged horse. Ludovico Ariosto's epic poem , which tells a similar story, has introduced further confusion. The tradition has been criticized for depicting the princess of Aethiopia as white; few artists have chosen to portray her as dark-skinned, despite Ovid's account of her. Others have noted that Perseus's liberation of Andromeda was a popular choice of subject among male artists, reinforcing a narrative of male superiority with its powerful male hero and its submissive female in bondage.

Classical mythology 

The name Andromeda is from the Greek , perhaps meaning 'mindful of her husband'.

Central story 

In Greek mythology, Andromeda is the daughter of Cepheus and Cassiopeia, king and queen of ancient Aethiopia. Her mother Cassiopeia foolishly boasts that she is more beautiful than the Nereids, a display of hubris by a human that is unacceptable to the gods. To punish the queen for her arrogance, Poseidon floods the Ethiopian coast and sends a sea monster named Cetus to ravage the kingdom's inhabitants. In desperation, King Cepheus consults the oracle of Ammon, who announces that no respite can be found until the king sacrifices his daughter, Andromeda, to the monster. She is thus stripped naked and chained to a rock in Jaffa by the sea to await her death. Perseus is just then flying near the coast of Ethiopia on his winged sandals, having slain the Gorgon Medusa and carrying her severed head, which instantly turns to stone any who look at it. Upon seeing Andromeda bound to the rock, Perseus falls in love with her, and he secures Cepheus' promise of her hand in marriage if he can save her. Perseus kills the monster with the magical sword he had used against Medusa, saving Andromeda. Preparations are then made for their marriage, in spite of her having been previously promised to her uncle, Phineus. At the wedding, a quarrel between the rivals ends when Perseus shows Medusa's head to Phineus and his allies, turning them to stone.

Andromeda follows her husband to his native island of Serifos, where he rescues his mother, Danaë. They next go to Argos, where Perseus is the rightful heir to the throne. However, after accidentally killing Argos' king, his grandfather, Acrisius, Perseus chooses to become king of neighboring Tiryns instead. Perseus and Andromeda have seven sons: Perses (who, according to folk etymology, is the ancestor of the Persians), Alcaeus, Heleus, Mestor, Sthenelus, Electryon, and Cynurus as well as two daughters, Autochthe and Gorgophone. Their descendants rule Mycenae from Electryon down to Eurystheus, after whom Atreus attains the kingdom. The great hero Heracles (Hercules in Roman mythology) is also a descendant, his mother Alcmene being Electryon's daughter, while (like his grandfather Perseus) his father is the god Zeus.

The goddess Athena (or her Roman version Minerva) places Andromeda in the northern sky at her death as the constellation Andromeda, along with Perseus and her parents Cepheus and Cassiopeia, in commemoration of Perseus' bravery in fighting the sea monster Cetus.

Variants 

There are several variants of the legend. In Hyginus's account, Perseus does not ask for Andromeda's hand in marriage before saving her, and when he afterwards intends to keep her for his wife, both her father Cepheus and her uncle Phineas plot against him, and Perseus resorts to using Medusa's head to turn them to stone. The primary classical sources have Perseus kill Cetus with his magical sword, even though he also carries Medusa's head, which could easily turn the monster to stone (and Perseus does use Medusa's head for this purpose in other situations). The earliest straightforward account of Perseus using Medusa's head against Cetus, however, is from the later 2nd-century AD satirist Lucian.

The 12th-century Byzantine writer John Tzetzes says that Cetus swallows Perseus, who kills the monster by hacking his way out with his sword. Conon places the story in Joppa (Iope or Jaffa, on the coast of modern Israel), and seeks to rationalize the myth by making Andromeda's uncles Phineus and Phoinix rivals for her hand in marriage; her father Cepheus contrives to have Phoinix abduct her in a ship named Cetos from a small island she visits to make sacrifices to Aphrodite, and Perseus, sailing nearby, intercepts and destroys Cetos and its crew, who are "petrified by shock" at his bravery.

In constellations 

Andromeda is represented in the Northern sky by the constellation constellation Andromeda, mentioned by the astronomer Ptolemy in the 2nd century, which contains the Andromeda Galaxy. Several constellations are associated with the myth. Viewing the fainter stars visible to the naked eye, the constellations are rendered as a maiden (Andromeda) chained up, facing or turning away from the ecliptic; a warrior (Perseus), often depicted holding the head of Medusa, next to Andromeda; a huge man (Cepheus) wearing a crown, upside down with respect to the ecliptic; a smaller figure (Cassiopeia) next to the man, sitting on a chair; a whale or sea monster (Cetus) just beyond Pisces, to the south-east; the flying horse Pegasus, who was born from the stump of Medusa's neck after Perseus had decapitated her; the paired fish of the constellation Pisces, that in myth were caught by Dictys the fisherman who was brother of Polydectes, king of Seriphos, the place where Perseus and his mother Danaë were stranded.

In literature

In poetry 

George Chapman's poem in heroic couplets Andromeda liberata, Or the nuptials of Perseus and Andromeda, was written for the 1614 wedding of Robert Carr, 1st Earl of Somerset and Frances Howard. The wedding, which led to a "train of intrigue and murder and executions, was the scandal of the age." Scholars have been surprised that Chapman should have celebrated such a marriage, and his choice of an allegory of the Perseus-Andromeda myth for the purpose. The poem infuriated both Carr and the Earl of Essex, causing Chapman to publish a "[J]ustification" of his approach. Chapman's poem sees human nature as chaotic and disorderly, like the sea monster, opposed by Andromeda's beauty and Perseus's balanced nature; their union brings about an astrological harmony of Venus and Mars which perfects the character of Perseus, since Venus was thought always to dominate Mars. Unfortunately for Chapman, Essex supposed that he was represented by the "barraine rocke" that Andromeda was chained up to: Howard had divorced Essex on the grounds that he could not consummate their marriage, and she had married Carr with her hair untied, indicating that she was a virgin. Further, the poem could be read as having dangerous political implications, involving King James.

Ludovico Ariosto's influential epic poem  (1516–1532) features a pagan princess named Angelica who at one point is in exactly the same situation as Andromeda, chained naked to a rock on the sea as a sacrifice to a sea monster, and is saved at the last minute by the Saracen knight Ruggiero. Images of Angelica and Ruggiero are often hard to distinguish from those of Andromeda and Perseus.

John Keats's 1819 sonnet On the Sonnet compares the restricted sonnet form to the bound Andromeda as being "Fetter'd, in spite of pained loveliness". William Morris retells the story of Perseus and Andromeda in his epic 1868 poem The Earthly Paradise, in the section April: The Doom of King Acrisius. Gerard Manley Hopkins' sonnet]Andromeda (1879) has invited many interpretations. Charles Kingsley's free verse poem retelling the myth, Andromeda (1858), was set to music by Cyril Rootham in his Andromeda (1905); judging the poem's style to be "unfamiliar to most modern audiences", the cartoonist Matt Lawrence was commissioned in 2015 to create a set of cartoons to tell the poem's story.

In novels 

In the 1851 novel Moby-Dick, Herman Melville's narrator Ishmael discusses the Perseus and Andromeda myth in two chapters. Chapter 55, "Of the Monstrous Pictures of Whales," mentions depictions of Perseus rescuing Andromeda from Cetus in artwork by Guido Reni and William Hogarth. In Chapter 82, "The Honor and Glory of Whaling," Ishmael recounts the myth and says that the Romans found a giant whale skeleton in Joppa that they believed to be the skeleton of Cetus. Jules Laforgue included what Knutson calls "a remarkable satirical adaptation", in his 1887 . All the traditional elements are present, along with elements of fantasy and lyricism, but only to allow Laforgue to parody them. The romance, crime, and thriller writer Carlton Dawe's 1909 novel The New Andromeda (published in America as The Woman, the Man, and the Monster) offers what was called at the time a "wholly unconventional" retelling of the Andromeda story in a modern setting. Robert Nichols's 1923 short story Perseus and Andromeda satirically retells the story in contrasting styles. In her 1978 novel The Sea, the Sea, Iris Murdoch uses the Andromeda myth, as presented in a reproduction of Titian's painting Perseus and Andromeda in the Wallace Collection in London, to reflect the character and motives of her characters. Charles has an LSD-fuelled vision of a serpent; when he returns to London, he becomes ill on seeing Titian's painting, whereupon his cousin James comes to his rescue.

In the performing arts

In theatre 

The theme, well suited to the stage, was introduced to theatre by Sophocles in his lost tragedy Andromeda (5th century BC), surviving only in fragments. Euripides took up the theme in his play of the same name (412 BC), also now lost, but parodied by Aristophanes in his comedy  (411 BC) and influential in the ancient world. In the parody, Mnesilochus is shaved and dressed as a woman to gain entrance to the women's secret rites, held in honour of the fertility goddess Demeter. Euripides swoops mock-heroically across the stage as Perseus on a theatrical crane, trying and failing to rescue Mnesilochus, who responds by acting out the role of Andromeda.

The legend of Perseus and Andromeda became popular among playwrights in the 17th century, including Lope de Vega's 1621 , and Pierre Corneille's famous 1650 verse play , with dramatic stage machinery effects, including Perseus astride Pegasus as he battles the sea monster. The production was a radical departure from the tradition of French theatre, based in part on the Italian tradition of operas about Andromeda; it was semi-operatic, with many songs, set to music by D'Assouci, alongside the Italian painter Giacomo Torelli's stage scenery. Corneille chose to present Andromeda fully-clothed, supposing that her nakedness had been merely a painterly tradition; Knutson comments that in so doing, "he unintentionally broke the last link with the early erotic myth."

Pedro Calderón de la Barca's 1653  was also inspired by Corneille, and like  was heavily embellished with the playwrights' inventions and traditional additions.

The Andromeda theme was explored later in works such as Muriel Stuart's closet drama Andromeda Unfettered (1922), featuring: Andromeda, "the spirit of woman"; Perseus, "the new spirit of man"; a chorus of "women who desire the old thrall"; and a chorus of "women who crave the new freedom".

In music and opera 

The Andromeda theme has been popular in classical music since the 17th century. It became a theme for opera from the 16th century, with an Andromeda in Italy in 1587. This was followed by Claudio Monteverdi's Andromeda (1618-1620): its libretto survives but the music has been lost. Benedetto Ferrari's Andromeda, with music by Francesco Manelli, was the first opera performed in a public theatre, Venice's Teatro San Cassiano, in 1637, the year that theatre was inaugurated. This set the pattern for Italian opera for several centuries.

Jean-Baptiste Lully's  (1682), a tragédie lyrique in 5 acts, was inspired by the popularity of Corneille's play. The libretto was by Philippe Quinault, and a real horse appeared on stage as Pegasus.  saw an initial run of 33 consecutive performances, 45 in total, which was exceptional at that time. Written for King Louis XIV, it has been described as Lully's "greatest creation[...] considered the crowning achievement of 17th century French music theatre. Filled with dancing, fight scenes, monsters and special effects[...] [a] truly spectacular opera". Michael Haydn wrote the music for another in 1797. A total of seventeen Andromeda operas were created in Italy in the 18th century.

Other classical works have taken a variety of forms including  (1726), a pasticcio-serenata on the subject of Perseus freeing Andromeda, made as a collective tribute to the visiting Cardinal Pietro Ottoboni by at least five composers working in Venice, including Vivaldi; 's  (possibly 1762), a cantata for solo voice and orchestra; and Carl Ditters von Dittersdorf's Symphony in F (Perseus' Rescue of Andromeda) and Symphony in D (The Petrification of Phineus and his Friends), Nos. 4 and 5 of his Symphonies after Ovid's Metamorphoses.

In the 19th century, Augusta Holmès composed the symphonic poem  (1883), while Guillaume Lekeu wrote  (1891), a cantata for four voices, chorus and orchestra. In the 20th century, Jose Antonio Bottiroli composed Andrómeda, Micro-sorrow I in D minor B96 for piano (1984). In 2019, Caroline Mallonée wrote her Portraits of Andromeda for cello and string orchestra.

In popular music, the theme is employed in tracks on Weyes Blood's 2019 album Titanic Rising and on Ensiferum's 2020 album Thalassic.

In film 

The 1981 film Clash of the Titans is loosely based on the story of Perseus, Andromeda, and Cassiopeia. In the film the monster is a kraken, a giant squid-like sea monster in Norse mythology, rather than the whale-like Cetos of Greek mythology. Perseus defeats the sea monster by showing it Medusa's face to turn it into stone, rather than using his magical sword, and rides Pegasus.

The 2010 remake with the same title, adapts the original story. Andromeda is set to be sacrificed to the kraken but is saved by Perseus. The historian and filmmaker Henry Louis Gates Jr. criticizes both the original film and its remake for using white actresses to portray the Ethiopian princess Andromeda.

In art

Merged traditions 

The legend of Saint George and the Dragon, in which a courageous knight rescues a princess from a monster (with clear parallels to the Andromeda myth), became a popular subject for art in the Late Middle Ages, and artists drew from both traditions. One result is that Perseus is often shown with the flying horse Pegasus when fighting the sea monster, even though classical sources consistently state that he flew using winged sandals.

Idealized beauty to realism 

Andromeda, and her role in the popular myth of Perseus, has been the subject of numerous ancient and modern works of art, where she is represented as a bound and helpless, typically beautiful, young woman placed in terrible danger, who must be saved through the unswerving courage of a hero who loves her. She is often shown, as by Rubens, with Perseus and the flying horse Pegasus at the moment she is freed. Rembrandt, in contrast, shows a suffering Andromeda, frightened and alone. She is depicted naturalistically, exemplifying the painter's rejection of idealized beauty. Frederic, Lord Leighton's Gothic style 1891 Perseus and Andromeda painting presents the white body of Andromeda in pure and untouched innocence, indicating an unfair sacrifice for a divine punishment that was not directed towards her, but to her mother. Pegasus and Perseus are surrounded by a halo of light that connects them visually to the white body of the princess.

Varied materials and approaches 

Apart from oil on canvas, artists have used a variety of materials to depict the myth of Andromeda, including the sculptor Domenico Guidi's marble, and François Boucher's etching. In modern art of the 20th century, artists moved to depict the myth in new ways. Félix Vallotton's 1910 Perseus Killing the Dragon is one of several paintings, such as his 1908 The Rape of Europa, in which the artist depicts human bodies using a harsh light which makes them appear brutal.
Alexander Liberman's 1962 Andromeda is a black circle on a white field, transected by purple and dark green crescent arcs.

Analysis

Ethnicity 

Andromeda was the daughter of the king and queen of Aethiopia, which ancient Greeks located at the edge of the world in Nubia, the lands south of Egypt. The term Aithiops was applied to peoples who dwelt above the equator, between the Atlantic and Indian Oceans. Homer says the Ethiopians live "at the world's end, and lie in two halves, the one looking West and the other East"; an idea echoed by Ovid, who located Ethiopia next to India, close to where the sun rises each day. The 5th-century BC historian Herodotus writes that "Where south inclines westwards, the part of the world stretching farthest towards the sunset is Ethiopia", and also included a plan by Cambyses II of Persia to invade Ethiopia (Kush).

By the 1st century BC a rival location for Andromeda's story had been established, however: an outcrop of rocks near the ancient port city of Joppa, as reported by Pomponius Mela, the traveller Pausanias, the geographer Strabo, and the historian Josephus. A case has been made that this new version of the myth was exploited to enhance the fame and serve the local tourist trade of Joppa, which also became connected with the biblical story of Jonah and yet another huge sea creature. This was at odds with Andromeda's African origins, adding to the confusion already surrounding her ethnicity, as reflected in 5th-century Greek vase images showing Andromeda attended by dark-skinned African servants and wearing clothing that would have looked foreign to Greeks, yet with light skin. 

In Greek Anthology, Philodemus (1st century BC) wrote about the "Indian Andromeda".

The art historian Elizabeth McGrath discusses the tradition, as promoted by the influential Roman poet Ovid, that Andromeda was a dark-skinned woman of either Ethiopian or Indian origin. In his Heroides, Ovid has Sappho explain to Phaon: "though I'm not pure white, Cepheus's dark Andromeda/charmed Perseus with her native colour./White doves often choose mates of different hue/and the parrot loves the black turtle dove"; the Latin word  Ovid uses here for 'dark Andromeda' refers to the colour black or brown. Elsewhere he says that Perseus brought Andromeda from "darkest" India and declares "Nor was Andromeda's colour any problem/to her wing-footed aerial lover" adding that "White suits dark girls; you looked so attractive in white, Andromeda". Ovid's account of Andromeda's story follows Euripides' play Andromeda in having Perseus initially mistake the chained Andromeda for a statue of marble, which has been taken to mean she was light-skinned; but since statues in Ovid's time were commonly painted to look like living people, her skin could have been of any colour. The ambiguity is reflected in a description by the 2nd-century AD sophist Philostratus of a painting depicting Perseus and Andromeda. He emphasizes the painting's Ethiopian setting, and notes that Andromeda "is charming in that she is fair of skin though in Ethiopia," in clear contrast to the other "charming Ethiopians with their strange coloring and their grim smiles" who have assembled to cheer Perseus in this picture.

Artworks in the modern era continue to portray Andromeda as fair-skinned, regardless of her stated origins; only a small minority of artists, such as an engraving after Abraham van Diepenbeeck, have chosen to show her as dark. The journalist Patricia Yaker Ekall comments that even this work depicts Andromeda with "European features". She suggests that the "narrative" of white superiority took precedence, and that "the visual of a white man rescuing a chained up black woman would have been too much of a trigger".

Bondage and rescue 

The imagery of Perseus and Andromeda was depicted by many artists of the Victorian era. Adrienne Munich states that most of these choose the moment after the hero Perseus has killed Medusa and is preparing to "slay the dragon and unbind the maiden". In her view, this transitional moment just precedes "the hero's final test of manhood before entering adult sexuality". Andromeda, on the other hand, "has no story, but she has a role and a lineage", being a princess, and having "attributes: chains, nakedness, flowing hair, beauty, virginity. Without a voice in her fate, she neither defies the gods nor chooses her mate." Munich comments that given that most of the artists were men, "it can be thought of as a male myth", providing convenient gender roles. She cites Catherine MacKinnon's description of the gender differences as "the erotization of dominance and submission": the male gets the power and the female is submissive. Further, the rescue myth provides a "veneer of charity" over the themes of aggression and possession.

Munich likens the effect to John Everett Millais's 1870 painting The Knight Errant, where the knight, "errant like Oedipus", finds a man sexually assaulting a bound and naked woman, which she calls a Freudian "primal scene". The knight kills the man and frees the woman. She asks whether Millais's knight is hiding from the woman's body, or demonstrating self-control, or whether he has "killed his own more aggressive self". She states that similar psychological themes are implied by the story of Perseus and Andromeda: Perseus makes Andromeda into a mother, thus Oedipally "conflating the purpose of his quest with the goal of finding a wife."

As for the bondage, Munich notes that the Victorian critic John Ruskin attacked male exploitation of what she calls "suffering nudes as subjects for titillating pictures." "Andromeda" is, she writes, the name of a type of "debased" imagery. She notes Ruskin's assertion that the image linked nude prostitutes to the naked Christ, both perverting the meaning of Andromeda's suffering and "blasphem[ing] Christ's sacrifice".

Further, Munich writes, Andromeda's name means 'Ruler of Men', hinting at her power; and indeed, she can be seen as "the good sister" of the monstrous female, the Medusa who turns men to stone. In psychological terms, she comments, "by slaying the Medusa and freeing Andromeda, the hero tames the chaotic female, the very sign of nature, simultaneously choosing and constructing the socially defined and acceptable female behavior."

The scholar of literature Harold Knutson describes the story as having a "disturbing sensuality", which together with the evident injustice of Andromeda's "undeserved sacrifice, create a curiously ambiguous effect". He suggests that in the earlier Palestinian version, the woman was the object of desire, Aphrodite/Ishtar/Astarte, and the hero was the sun god Marduk. The monster was woman in evil form, so chaining her human form would keep her from further evil. Knutson comments that the myth illustrates "the ambiguous male view of the eternal female principle."

Knutson writes that a similar pattern is seen in several other myths, including Heracles' rescue of Hesione; Jason's rescue of Medea from the hundred-eyed dragon; Cadmus's rescue of Harmonia from a dragon; and in an early version of another tale, Theseus's rescue of Ariadne from the Minotaur. He comments that all of this points to "the richness of the [story's] archetypal model", citing Hudo Hetzner's analysis of the many stories that involve a hero rescuing a maiden from a monster. The beast may be a sea-monster, or it may be a dragon that lives in a cave and terrifies a whole country, or the monstrous Count Dracula who lives in a castle.

See also 

 Hesione – saved by Heracles from a sea monster
 Iphigenia – sacrificed to the goddess Artemis (or rescued, depending on the version)

References

Sources 

Full text, translations, and background:
 Perseus Digital Library (Tufts University) https://www.perseus.tufts.edu/hopper/
 Theoi Greek Mythology https://www.theoi.com/

Primary Greek and Roman sources:
 Apollodorus, Library (Bibliotheca) 2.4.3–5 (online English translation by James George Frazer (1921): https://www.theoi.com/Text/Apollodorus1.html)
 Ovid, Metamorphoses 4.668–5.235 (online English translation by Brooks More (1922): https://www.theoi.com/Text/OvidMetamorphoses1.html)

Comprehensive studies:
 Edwin Hartland, The Legend of Perseus: A Study of Tradition in Story, Custom and Belief, 3 vols. (1894-1896)  (available online at: https://archive.org/details/legendofperseuss01hart/page/n6/mode/2up)
 Daniel Ogden, Perseus (Routledge, 2008) 

Metamorphoses characters
Princesses in Greek mythology
Queens in Greek mythology
Deeds of Poseidon
Love stories
Nude art
Iconography
Ethiopian characters in Greek mythology
Indian characters in Greek mythology
Race-related controversies in art